An election for President of Israel was held in the Knesset on 8 December 1952 following the death of the Israel's first president, Chaim Weizmann on 9 November. Between Weizmann's death and the winner of the election, Yitzhak Ben-Zvi, taking office on 16 December, Knesset speaker Yosef Sprinzak served as acting president.

Candidates
There were four candidates:
Yitzhak Ben-Zvi: One of the founders of Mapai (the ruling party, for whom he was a member of the Knesset) and the Histadrut (the country's largest trade union), a former president of the Vaad Leumi, signatory of the Israel declaration of independence and a personal friend of Prime Minister David Ben-Gurion.
Peretz Bernstein: A member of the Knesset for the General Zionists and also a signatory of the country's declaration of independence.
Yitzhak Gruenbaum: A signatory of the Israeli declaration of independence, a minister in the provisional government, and though an adherent of Mapam, not a member of any political party.
Mordechai Nurock: A member of the Knesset for Mizrachi and Minister of Postal Services in the government at the time.

Before the election, Albert Einstein was spoken to by Abba Eban about the possibility of becoming President. He declined, explaining, "I have neither the natural ability nor the experience to deal with human beings."

Results
Three rounds of voting were required after no candidate gained an outright majority. Peretz Bernstein dropped out after the second round, with Yitzhak Ben-Zvi elected in the third round.

References

External links
Presidential elections Knesset website

1952 elections in Israel
Presidential election
1952
December 1952 events in Asia